This page contains a list of body modifications.

Explicit ornaments 

 Body piercing – permanent placement of jewelry through an artificial fistula; sometimes further modified by stretching
 Ear piercing – the most common type of body modification
 Pearling – also known as genital beading
 Neck ring – multiple neck rings or spiral are worn to give the effect of stretching the neck (in reality lowering the collarbones)
 Tattooing – injection of a pigment under the skin
 Teeth blackening
 Eye tattooing – injection of a pigment into the sclera
 Extraocular implant (eyeball jewelry) – the implantation of jewelry in the outer layer of the eye
 Surface piercing – a piercing where the entrance and exit holes are pierced through the same flat area of skin
 Microdermal implants
 Transdermal implant – implantation of an object below the dermis, but which exits the skin at one or more points

Subdermal implants 

 Subdermal implants – implantation of an object that resides entirely below the dermis, including horn implants

Removal or split 

 Hair cutting
 Hair removal
 Genital modification and mutilation:
 Female genital mutilation
 Clitoral hood reduction – removal of the clitoral hood
 Clitoridectomy – removal of the clitoris
 Infibulation – removal of the external genitalia (and suturing of the vulva)
 Labiaplasty – alteration (removal, reduction, enhancement, or creation) of the labia
 Circumcision – the partial or full removal of the foreskin, sometimes also the frenulum
 Foreskin restoration – techniques for attempting the restoration of the foreskin
 Emasculation – complete removal of the male genitalia (orchiectomy plus penectomy)
 Genital frenectomy
 Meatotomy – splitting of the underside of the glans penis
 Orchiectomy – removal of the testicles
 Penectomy – removal of the penis
 Subincision – splitting of the underside of the penis, also called urethrotomy
 Nipple removal
 Nipple splitting
 Nullification – the voluntary removal of body parts. Body parts that are commonly removed by those practicing body nullification include the penis, testicles, clitoris, labia and nipples. Sometimes people who desire a nullification may be diagnosed with gender dysphoria, body integrity identity disorder or apotemnophilia.
 Lingual frenectomy - this is to expand the external physical protrusion of the tongue.
 Tongue splitting – bisection of the tongue similar to a snake

Applying long-term force 
Some body modifications are the end result of long-term activities or practices involved in applying force, such as constriction, to a part of the body.

 Tightlacing – binding of the waist and shaping of the torso
 Cranial binding – modification of the shape of infants' heads, now extremely rare
 Breast ironing – Pressing (sometimes with a heated object) the breasts of a pubescent female to prevent their growth.
 Foot binding – compression of the feet of girls to modify them for aesthetic reasons
 Breast implants
 Jelqing – penis enlargement with physical exercises by using a milking motion, to enhance girth mainly over a period of two to three months; no weights or spacing devices are used
 Non-surgical elongation of organs by prolonged stretching using weights or spacing devices. Some cultural traditions prescribe for or encourage members of one sex (or both) to have one organ stretched till permanent re-dimensioning has occurred, such as:
 The 'giraffe-like' stretched necks (sometimes also other organs) of women among the Burmese Kayan tribe, the result of wearing brass coils around them. This compresses the collarbone and upper ribs but is not medically dangerous. It is a myth that removing the rings will cause the neck to 'flop'; Padaung women remove them regularly for cleaning etc.
 Stretched lip piercings – achieved by inserting ever larger plates, such as those made of clay used by some Amazonian tribes.
 Labia stretching or pulling to enhance sexual pleasure by stimulation, particularly reaching an orgasm that squirts, multiple orgasms that flow together frequently upon climax.
 Foreskin restoration or stretching to increase its physical size, desensitize the foreskin, move the foreskin further down the head for enhanced sensitivity and improve its appearance.

Others 

 Human branding – controlled burning or cauterizing of tissue to encourage intentional scarring
 Ear shaping (which includes cropping, ear pointing or "elfing")
 Scarification – cutting or removal of dermis with the intent to encourage intentional scarring or keloiding
 Human tooth sharpening – generally used to have the appearance of some sort of animal.
  – the deliberate misaligning or capping of teeth to give a crooked appearance. Popular in Japan.
 Tooth ablation or tooth-knocking – the act of deliberately knocking one's teeth out, often as a rite of passage or to satisfy an aesthetic ideal. Commonly practiced among Australian Aboriginals and Native Hawaiians prior to the 20th century, and observed in archaeological complexes around the world.

Gallery

References